Oodi or Odi is a village in Kgatleng District of Botswana. It is located 20  km north-east of Gaborone. The population was 5,687 in 2011 census.

References

Kgatleng District
Villages in Botswana